Algonova was a single-hulled oil tanker launched in 1969 as Texaco Chief for Texaco Canada Ltd. In 1986, the ship was renamed A. G. Farquharson. In 1995 the ship was sold to Imperial Oil. Purchased by Algoma Central in 1998, the ship was renamed Algonova. In 2007, Algoma Central sold the vessel to Belgrave Investors Corporation, which renamed the vessel Pacifico Trader. Helmer Business Incorporated acquired the vessel in 2012 and renamed the ship Great Portobello. The vessel is currently in active service.

Description
The ship was initially designed as a crane ship. However, the plan was abandoned and the vessel was re-designed as a single-hulled tanker. The vessel's gross register tonnage (GRT) was 5,038 and deadweight tonnage (DWT) of 6,358. The vessel had an initial ice class rating of Lloyd's Class 2, being built with an ice knife, but that was not renewed under its current ownership. Fueled by marine diesel oil, the vessel is propelled by a single controllable pitch propeller and a  bow thruster. The vessel has a current tonnage of 4,605 GRT and 6,996 DWT.

Service history
The ship was laid down on 23 July 1968 by Collingwood Shipbuilding of Collingwood, Ontario, as a crane vessel for Yankcanuck Steamships Ltd. of Sault Ste. Marie, Ontario. In September 1968 the company decided not to build the ship, and the hull was sold to Texaco Canada Ltd., and redesigned as a single-hulled tanker. The ship was launched on 10 April 1969, and named Texaco Chief. She served on the Great Lakes, the Saint Lawrence River, and on the eastern coast of Canada. Texaco Chief suffered minor damage and was repaired by Canadian Vickers in Montreal, Quebec. The ship ran aground on 4 December 1972 near Ogdensburg, New York. The ship suffered no damage. In 1986 Texaco Chief was renamed A.G. Farquharson, after the former president and CEO of Texaco Canada. The ship was purchased by Imperial Oil in 1995 and kept in service until laid up at Halifax, Nova Scotia in October 1996.

The ship was purchased by Algoma Tankers Limited, a subsidiary of Algoma Central, in early 1998 and renamed Algonova. She operated mainly between Sarnia and Thunder Bay, until new regulations requiring double-hulled tankers in North American ports came into force in 2005. A new double-hulled tanker of the same name entered service in 2008.

In 2006 the ship was sold to the Belgrave Investors Corporation of Panama City, Panama, and renamed Pacifico Trader. In January 2007 she sailed for Panama where she operated as a bunker ship. In 2012, the ship was acquired by Helmer Business Incorporated of Panama City. The ship was renamed Great Portobello.

References

1969 ships
Tankers of Canada
Ships built in Collingwood, Ontario
Algoma Central Marine